Muhammad Cassim Siddi Lebbe (11 June 1838 – 5 February 1898), also known as Mukammatu Kacim Cittilevvai, was a Ceylonese lawyer, educationist, scholar, philosopher, seer, writer, publisher, social reformer, and Muslim community leader.

Genealogy
The Lebbe family claimed ancestry from Arabs who settled in on the western coast of Sri Lanka and later penetrated into the Kandyan District, where his father was born. His father, Muhammad Lebbe Siddi Lebbe, was one of the first Ceylonese proctors and was also the Head Moorman in 1833.

Early life
Lebbe was born in Kandy as the third of five siblings. Education was important in his upbringing and he became well-versed in Arabic, Tamil and English. Lebbe found himself a lawyer at 24 and practiced in settings ranging from local municipal courthouses to the Supreme Court to which he was appointed in 1864. Siddi Lebbe had an older brother named Muhammad Lebbe, an Arabic-educated Alim, under whom he learnt to read Qur'an and study Tamil and English. He was later admitted to the 'General Schooling' and educated in English.

Establishments and services
 In 1884, he established the first Anglo-Mohammedan school at Colombo with the assistance of Orabi Pasha and Wapichie Marikkar.
 In 1882, he introduced a madrasa called 'Madrasatul Zahira' in Maradana, Colombo. Later in 1892 the 'Madrasatul Zahira' became a school under the name of Zahira College.
 Established schools in Kandy, Gampola, Polgahawela and Kurunegala.
 Founded a Girls' school in Kandy.
 Published the first Muslim journal Muslim Nesan in Tamil language on 12 December 1882.
 Printed school textbooks and distributed them for free to students.
 Established Siddhi Lebbe Maha Vidyalaya, Kandy

His wide scheme of educating the Muslim community resulted in the establishment of Zahira College, patronised by the elite in the community due to the munificence of Wapchi Marikar. He also established a number of Tamil and Arabic Schools in many parts of the Central Province, some of which he managed and financed. In Kandy, he founded a Girls' School where his sister was the Head-Teacher. He was adept in Arabic and read many significant works of Islamic scholars and in religious knowledge surpassing that of the local Ulema of the time. The educational movement in Colombo, which he began with Wapchi Marikar, required his presence in Colombo due to which he lived there, occasionally visiting his hometown in Kandy.

Journals and Works
 Muslim Nesan - "The Muslim Friend" in English and Tamil, aimed at educating the Muslim community.
 Torch of Wishdom - A monthly journal aimed at teaching Muslims Islam and advocated Muslims learn Arabic.
 Gjana Theepan (1892)
 Assan Beyudaya Kadhai (1885) - "The Story of Hassan Bey" was the second novel written in Tamil, and the first Tamil novel written in Ceylon. It chronicles an Egyptian protagonist who is kidnapped as a child, and raised in India. The child receives an English education, later returning to Egypt, reuniting with his family. The novel is characterized as expressing some of Lebbe's own aspirations.
 Hidayathul Cassimiya
 Tuhuwathul Nahwa - "Key to Grammar"
 Shurut As Salat - "Observance of Prayer"
 Arabic Study Book Part I & II
 Tamil Primer
 History of the Turkish and Greek War
 History of the Moors of Ceylon

He used the medium of newspaper articles, books, and speeches to induce the Muslim community to make an attempt to uplift themselves from the backward condition they were in. Though numerous were his friends and admirers he did have his share of opponents too, who were not convinced of his understanding of the interpretation and philosophical understanding of Islam.

Legacy
Lebbe was made a National Hero by the Central Government for his life and work. A Rs. 1 stamp was issued on June 11, 1977, to commemorate him.

Notes

References

Bibliography

 	

1838 births
1898 deaths
People from Kandy
People from British Ceylon
Sri Lankan Moor educators
Sri Lankan Muslims
Ceylonese proctors